Bearcat is an album by jazz saxophonist Clifford Jordan which was recorded in late 1961 and early 1962 and released on the Jazzland label.

Reception

Writing in the Chicago Tribune about the 1991 reissue, Jack Fuller stated: "For me hard bop is like the blues that you find at its core. I can always listen to it with pleasure. It is never monotonous, no matter how closely it hews to the norm. And when it is energetic and smiling, as it is on this reissue of a 1962 release by tenor saxophonist Clifford Jordan backed by pianist Cedar Walton, it can almost always lift my spirits, too". Scott Yanow stated in his review for Allmusic: "It would be 1973 before Jordan had another opportunity to be showcased in a quartet format, making this formerly rare set one of his best all-around recordings".

Track listing
All compositions by Clifford Jordan except as indicated
 "Bear Cat" - 4:56  
 "Dear Old Chicago" - 5:30  
 "How Deep Is the Ocean?" (Irving Berlin) - 4:58  
 "The Middle of the Block" - 4:59 
 "You Better Leave It Alone" - 5:57  
 "Malice Towards None" (Tom McIntosh) - 5:58  
 "Out-House" - 5:29

Personnel
Clifford Jordan — tenor saxophone
Cedar Walton - piano 
Teddy Smith - bass
J. C. Moses - drums

References

1962 albums
Clifford Jordan albums
Jazzland Records (1960) albums
Albums produced by Orrin Keepnews